The Leitrim Senior Football Championship is an annual football competition contested by top-tier Leitrim GAA clubs. The Leitrim County Board of the Gaelic Athletic Association has organised it since 1890.

St Mary's, Kiltoghert are the title holders (2022) defeating Mohill in the Final.

History
The 1962 championship had been declared null and void, but in March 2009 Melvin Gaels were declared as champions, ending the longest-running dispute the GAA had ever had.

The final play of the 1994 Leitrim Senior Football Championship between Allen Gaels and Aughawillan proved contentious as Martin McGowan of Allen Gaels, who was playing with a dislocated spine, stood to take a free. Aughawillan's full-back, Martin Flanagan, took up a position behind his goalkeeper, Martin Prior. McGowan struck the ball and expressed certainty that it was two yards over the bar. However, Aughawillan's Flanagan gave Prior "a bit of a hoosh" and Prior, with his shoulders close to level with the crossbar, caught the ball. Referee Enda Stenson did not penalise the move and then blew the final whistle. Thus Allen Gaels were denied a replay and Aughawillan secured a third consecutive championship title.

Honours
The trophy presented to the winners is the ? The winning club qualifies to represent their county in the Connacht Senior Club Football Championship. The winners can, in turn, go on to play in the All-Ireland Senior Club Football Championship.

List of finals
(r) = replay

Notes
The name of the runner-up in some years is not given for a variety of reasons, such as the awarding of the championship to a team without a final being played, or the exact record of that year's championship being lost to history.

† The 1962 Championship had been declared null and void, but in March 2009 Melvin Gaels were declared as champions.

Wins listed by club

References

External links
Official Leitrim Website
Leitrim on Hoganstand
Leitrim Club GAA

 
Senior Gaelic football county championships